Jeremiah "Jerry" Cronin (born 1957) is an Irish retired hurler who played as a goalkeeper for the Cork senior team.

Cronin joined the team during the 1977 championship and was a regular member of the extended panel until his retirement after the 1979 championship. During that time he won two All-Ireland medals and three Munster medals as a non-playing substitute. Cronin was also an All-Ireland and Munster medalist in the junior grade.

At club level Cronin was a four-time junior divisional championship medalist with Newmarket.

Honours

Team
Newmarket
Duhallow Junior A Hurling Championship (4): 1974, 1975, 1976, 1979

Cork
All-Ireland Senior Hurling Championship (2): 1977 (sub), 1978 (sub)
Munster Senior Hurling Championship (3): 1977 (sub), 1978 (sub), 1979 (sub)
All-Ireland Junior Hurling Championship (1): 1983
Munster Junior Hurling Championship (1): 1983
All-Ireland Under-21 Hurling Championship (1): 1976
Munster Under-21 Hurling Championship (2): 1976, 1977
All-Ireland Minor Hurling Championship (1): 1974
Munster Minor Hurling Championship (1): 1974

References

1956 births
Living people
Newmarket hurlers
Duhallow hurlers
Cork inter-county hurlers